Alphonsus (Fonse) Faour (born November 16, 1951, in Corner Brook, Newfoundland) is a former Canadian politician.
Faour represented the electoral district of Humber—St. George's—St. Barbe, which he won in a 1978 by-election following the resignation of Jack Marshall. In the general election the following year, Faour retained the renamed seat of Humber—Port au Port—St. Barbe. However, in the 1980 election, Faour was defeated by Brian Tobin.

After the election, he became leader of the Newfoundland and Labrador New Democratic Party from 1980 to 1981. He resigned due to difficulties in concurrently maintaining his law practice and leading the party without a seat in the legislature.

In 2003, Faour was appointed to the trial division of the Supreme Court of Newfoundland and Labrador.

Archives 
There is an Alphonsus Faour fonds at Library and Archives Canada. Archival reference number is R3766.

References

External links

1951 births
Living people
Members of the House of Commons of Canada from Newfoundland and Labrador
New Democratic Party MPs
Leaders of the Newfoundland and Labrador NDP/CCF
Judges in Newfoundland and Labrador
People from Corner Brook
Canadian politicians of Lebanese descent